Asen Markov (born 27 June 1969) is a Bulgarian Olympic hurdler. He represented his country in the men's 400 metres hurdles at the 1992 Summer Olympics. His time was a 50.21 in the hurdles.

References

1969 births
Living people
Bulgarian male hurdlers
Olympic athletes of Bulgaria
Athletes (track and field) at the 1992 Summer Olympics